Laure Heriard Dubreuil is a French entrepreneur and the founder and creative director of The Webster. The Webster is a luxury multi-brand retailer operating five physical boutiques in the U.S. and an online store. Prior to founding The Webster, Heriard Dubreuil worked in merchandising for both Balenciaga and Yves Saint Laurent.

Early life and education
Heriard Dubreuil grew up in Paris, France as a member of the family that produces Rémy Martin cognac. She went to Sainte Marie de Neuilly highschool.  She attended Paris Dauphine University, where she studied economics and Mandarin at Institut National des Langues et Civilisations Orientales. She became fluent in Mandarin and spent time in Shanghai as part of her Far East Studies. In the late 90s, she decided to attend New York City's Fashion Institute of Technology (FIT) where she earned a degree in Merchandising.

Career
After graduating from FIT, Heriard Dubreuil returned to France where she worked as a merchandiser alongside Nicolas Ghesquière at Balenciaga and, later, alongside Stefano Pilati at Yves Saint Laurent. In 2007, she decided to move to Miami to open The Webster Miami. The shop features items from a number of prominent brands including Balmain, Azzedine Alaïa, Pierre Hardy, and Céline. The shop itself is housed in a renovated 1939 Art Deco building designed by Henry Hohauser on Collins Avenue in Miami Beach.

In 2012, Heriard Dubreuil facilitated a partnership between retailer Target and The Webster to become a part of "The Shops at Target" brand. In December 2013, The Webster opened a second location at the Bal Harbour Shops in Miami Beach. In January 2015, Heriard Dubreuil helped design an all-white capsule collection with French department store Le Bon Marché owned by LVMH. The collection was created for Le Bon Marché's annual "month of white" and features designers like Louis Vuitton, Marc Jacobs and Victoria Beckham. The collection was sold exclusively at The Webster and Le Bon Marché.
The Webster's fourth location in South Coast Plaza, Costa Mesa, California opened in September 2016. Followed by the fifth and newest location in SoHo, New York City, in November 2017. Measuring approximately 12,000 square feet, the building, which dates to 1878, features six stories, including a penthouse and a David Mallett salon.

On 29 November 2017, Heriard Dubreuil launched her debut collection of her new line, LHD. The upper contemporary label offers ready-to-wear, accessories, and exclusive collaborations fit for a global lifestyle. A well-seasoned traveler with an admirable passport, Laure wanted to create a collection inspired by the destinations she loves most. With an emphasis on exclusive prints, electric color palettes, and vintage inspired silhouettes, LHD is at once glamorous, timeless, feminine, and, most importantly, effortless. LHD sells exclusively at lhd.us,thewebster.us, and The Webster boutiques.

Heriard Dubreuil has been a frequent participant in and proponent of the Art Basel Art Fair in Miami Beach. As a revered member of the fashion industry, Laure has participated in the prestigious WWD's annual CEO Summit, currently serves on the expert committee of LVMH's annual fashion prize which fosters young talent and recognized by Business of Fashion, for the past 2 consecutive years, among their top BoF 500: The People Shaping The Global Fashion Industry. Laure was a member of the fashion jury for the 32nd Fashion and photography festival at Hyères and most recently a judge for the Vogue Mexico 'Who's on Next' competition in 2018. In 2015 Laure became an ambassador of mothers 2 mothers, a global not-for-profit organization leading efforts in Sub Saharan Africa to end pediatric AIDS, ensuring good health and wellbeing for everyone, and achieving gender equality.

Personal life
Heriard Dubreuil is married to New York-based artist Aaron Young. In early 2014, the couple had their first child.

References

External links
The Webster Official Website

Living people
Businesspeople from Paris
Fashion Institute of Technology alumni
Year of birth missing (living people)
Paris Dauphine University alumni